Räntämäki is a district in the Koroinen ward of the city of Turku, in Finland. It is located to the north of the city, and consists mostly of low-density residential area.

Population
The current population of Räntämäki is 1,924, and it is increasing at an annual rate of 0.68%. 17.78% of the district's population are under 15 years old, while 9.20% are over 65. The district's linguistic makeup is 88.31% Finnish, 5.15% Swedish, and 6.55% other.

See also
 Districts of Turku
 Districts of Turku by population

Districts of Turku